Quincy is a coastal U.S. city in Norfolk County, Massachusetts, United States. It is the largest city in the county and a part of Metropolitan Boston as one of Boston's immediate southern suburbs. Its population in 2020 was 101,636, making it the seventh-largest city in the state. Known as the "City of Presidents", Quincy is the birthplace of two U.S. presidents—John Adams and his son John Quincy Adams—as well as John Hancock (a President of the Continental Congress and the first signer of the Declaration of Independence) and the first and third Governor of Massachusetts.

First settled in 1625, Quincy was briefly part of Dorchester before becoming the north precinct of Braintree in 1640. In 1792, Quincy was split off from Braintree; the new town was named after Colonel John Quincy, maternal grandfather of Abigail Adams and after whom John Quincy Adams was also named. Quincy became a city in 1888.

For more than a century, Quincy was home to a thriving granite industry; the city was also the site of the Granite Railway, the United States' first commercial railroad. Shipbuilding at the Fore River Shipyard was another key part of the city's economy. In the 20th century, both Howard Johnson's and Dunkin' Donuts were founded in the city.

History

Pre-Colonial Period to the Revolution 

The road that eventually became the Old Coast Road from Boston to Plymouth, going through Quincy and Braintree, started out as a native american trail.

Massachusett sachem Chickatawbut had his seat on a hill called Moswetuset Hummock prior to the settlement of the area by English colonists, situated east of the mouth of the Neponset River near what is now called Squantum. It was visited in 1621 by Plymouth Colony commander Myles Standish and Squanto, a native guide.

Four years later, a party led by Captain Richard Wollaston established a post on a low hill near the south shore of Quincy Bay east of present-day Black's Creek. The settlers found the area suitable for farming, as Chickatawbut and his group had cleared much of the land of trees. (The Indians used the name Passonagessit ("Little Neck of Land") for the area.) This settlement was named Mount Wollaston in honor of the leader, who left the area soon after 1625, bound for Virginia.

The Wollaston neighborhood in Quincy still retains Captain Wollaston's name. Upon the departure of Wollaston, Thomas Morton took over leadership of the post. Morton's history of conflict with the Plymouth settlement and his free-thinking ideals antagonized the Plymouth settlement, who maligned the colony and accused it of  debauchery with Indian women and drunkenness. Morton renamed the settlement Ma-re-Mount ("Hill by the Sea") and later wrote that the conservative separatists of Plymouth Colony to the south were "threatening to make it a woefull mount and not a merry mount", in reference to the fact that they disapproved of his libertine practices. In 1627, Morton was arrested by Standish for violating the code of conduct in a way harmful to the colony. He was sent back to England, only to return and be arrested by Puritans the next year. The area of Quincy now called Merrymount is located on the site of the original English settlement of 1625 and takes its name from the punning name given by Morton.

The area was first incorporated as part of Dorchester in 1630 and was briefly annexed by Boston in 1634. The area became Braintree in 1640, bordered along the coast of Massachusetts Bay by Dorchester to the north and Weymouth to the east. Beginning in 1708, the modern border of Quincy first took shape as the North Precinct of Braintree.

Post-Revolution 

Following the American Revolution, Quincy was officially incorporated as a separate town named for Col. John Quincy in 1792, the grandfather of Abigail Adams  and was made a city in 1888. Quincy, Massachusetts, is the only one of 17 cities named Quincy in the United States whose residents pronounce the name as (/ˈkwɪnzi/ KWIN-zee) rather than "QUINCE-ee." In 1845 the Old Colony Railroad opened; the Massachusetts Historical Commission stated that the railroad was "the beginning of a trend toward suburbanization". Quincy became as accessible to Boston as was Charlestown. The first suburban land company, Bellevue Land Co., had been organized in northern Quincy in 1870. Quincy's population grew by over 50 percent during the 1920s.

Among the city's several firsts was the Granite Railway, the first commercial railroad in the United States. It was constructed in 1826 to carry granite from a Quincy quarry to the Neponset River in Milton so that the stone could then be taken by boat to erect the Bunker Hill Monument in Charlestown. Quincy granite became famous throughout the nation, and stonecutting became the city's principal economic activity. Quincy was also home to the first iron furnace in the United States, the John Winthrop Jr. Iron Furnace Site (also known as Braintree Furnace), from 1644 to 1653.

In the 1870s, the city gave its name to the Quincy Method, an influential approach to education developed by Francis W. Parker while he served as Quincy's superintendent of schools. Parker, an early proponent of progressive education, put his ideas into practice in the city's underperforming schools; four years later, a state survey found that Quincy's students were excelling. Many of Quincy’s teachers were recruited by districts in other states, spreading the Quincy method beyond Massachusetts to New Jersey, New York, Connecticut, Vermont, Florida, Minnesota, and other places.

Quincy was additionally important as a shipbuilding center. Sailing ships were built in Quincy for many years, including the only seven-masted schooner ever built, Thomas W. Lawson. The Fore River area became a shipbuilding center in the 1880s; founded by Thomas A. Watson, who became wealthy as assistant to Alexander Graham Bell in developing the telephone, many famous warships were built at the Fore River Shipyard. John J. Kilroy, reputed originator of the famous Kilroy was here graffiti, was a rivet inspector at Fore River.

Quincy was also an aviation pioneer thanks to Dennison Field. Located in the Squantum section of town it was one of the world's first airports and was partially developed by Amelia Earhart. In 1910, it was the site of the Harvard Aero Meet, the second air show in America. It was later leased to the Navy for an airfield, and served as a reserve Squantum Naval Air Station into the 1950s. The Army has also long maintained a presence in the city, with the Massachusetts Army National Guard occupying the Kelley Armory in Wollaston, from 1971 to 1976 it served as headquarters for the 187th Infantry Brigade.

The Howard Johnson's and Dunkin' Donuts restaurant chains were both founded in Quincy. Celtic punk band Dropkick Murphys got its start in the city's Wollaston neighborhood in 1996. Quincy is also home to the United States' longest-running Flag Day parade, a tradition that began in 1952 under Richard Koch, a former director of Parks and Recreation, who started the "Koch Club" sports organization for kids and had an annual parade with flags.

Geography 

Quincy shares borders with Boston to the north (separated by the Neponset River), Milton to the west, Randolph and Braintree to the south, and Weymouth (separated by the Fore River) and Hull (maritime border between Quincy Bay and Hingham Bay) to the east. Historically, before incorporation when it was called "Mount Wollaston" and later as the "North Precinct" of Braintree, Quincy roughly began at the Neponset River in the north and ended at the Fore River in the south.

Quincy Bay, within city limits to the northeast, is part of Boston Harbor and Massachusetts Bay. There are several beaches in Quincy, including Wollaston Beach along Quincy Shore Drive. Located on the western shore of Quincy Bay, Wollaston Beach is the largest Boston Harbor beach. Quincy's territory includes Hangman Island, Moon Island (restricted access, and all land is owned by the City of Boston), Nut Island (now a peninsula), and Raccoon Island in the Boston Harbor Islands National Recreation Area.

The total area is 37.60% water.

Although Quincy is primarily urban,  or fully 23 percent of its land area lies within the uninhabited Blue Hills Reservation, a state park managed by the Massachusetts Department of Conservation and Recreation. This undeveloped natural area encompasses the southwestern portion of Quincy and includes the city's highest point,  Chickatawbut Hill. Other hills within Quincy include Forbes Hill in Wollaston, Presidents Hill in Quincy Center and Penns Hill in South Quincy.

Climate

Demographics
  

As of the 2010 United States Census, there were 92,271 people, 38,883 households, and 42,838 families residing in the city, making it the eighth-largest city in the state. The racial makeup of the city was 65.5% White, 4.6% African American, 0.16% Native American, 24.0% Asian (15.6% Chinese, 3.2% Vietnamese, 2.6% Indian), 0.02% Pacific Islander, 0.85% from other races, and 1.76% from two or more races. Hispanic or Latino of any race were 4.6% of the population. 33.5% were of Irish, 12.7% Italian and 5.0% English ancestry according to the 2000 Census. 77.1% spoke only English, while 8.0% spoke Chinese or Mandarin, 2.6% Cantonese, 1.9% Spanish, 1.5% Vietnamese and 1.3% Italian in their homes.

There were 38,883 households, out of which 20.7% had children under the age of 18 living with them, 38.7% were married couples living together, 10.5% had a female householder with no husband present, and 47.2% were non-families. 37.6% of all households were made up of individuals, and 13.4% had someone living alone who was 65 years of age or older. The average household size was 2.22 and the average family size was 3.03.

In the city, the age distribution of the population shows 17.5% under the age of 18, 8.1% from 18 to 24, 36.1% from 25 to 44, 22.1% from 45 to 64, and 16.3% who were 65 years of age or older. The median age was 38 years. For every 100 females, there were 91.0 males. For every 100 females age 18 and over, there were 88.5 males.

The median income for a household in the city was $59,803, and the median income for a family was $77,514. Males had a median income of $51,925 versus $44,175 for females. The per capita income for the city was $32,786. About 7.3% of families and 9.8% of the population were below the poverty line, including 13.7% of those under age 18 and 10.1% of those age 65 or over.

Asian community

As of 2010, Quincy has the highest per capita concentration of persons of Asian origin in Massachusetts. As of 2003 about 66% of the Asians in Quincy are ethnic Chinese, giving the city one of the largest Chinese populations in the state. There is also a community of persons of East Indian origins, with most of them working in information technology and other skilled professions. A growing number of people with Vietnamese origins live in the area as well and make up the second largest Asian American group in Quincy; it is estimated that nearly 4,000 Vietnamese people live in the city.

In 1980, there were 750 persons of Asian origin in Quincy. Most of the Asian immigrants coming in the 1980s originated from Hong Kong and Taiwan. In 1990, Quincy had 5,577 persons of Asian origin, with 143 of them being of East Indian origin. The number of Asians increased to 13,546 in 2000, with about 9,000 of them being ethnic Chinese, and 1,127 of them being ethnic East Indian. The latter group grew by 688%, making it the fastest-growing Asian subgroup in Quincy. Around 2003, most Asian immigrants were coming from Fujian instead of Hong Kong and Taiwan. At that time, Quincy had a higher Asian population than the Boston Chinatown. The overall Asian population increased by 64% in the following decade, to 22,174 in 2010. Quincy's Chinese population increased by 60% during that time period.

Historically, Quincy residents traveled to shops in Chinatown, Boston, but by 2003 Asian shopping centers became established in Quincy. By 2003, New York City-based Kam Man Food was establishing a supermarket in Quincy. In February 2017, City Councilor Nina Liang presented a motion to designate Quincy as a "Sanctuary City". This motion was voted down by the City Council. Quincy has an estimated 8,000 undocumented residents and has the 11th-highest concentration of immigrants in Massachusetts overall.

As of 2000, about 50% of Asians in Quincy own their own houses; many who rent do so while saving money for down payments for their houses. Sixty-five percent of the Chinese were homeowners, while only 10% of the East Indians were homeowners. As of 2003, slightly more than 2,500 Asian Americans in Quincy were registered to vote, making up almost 25% of Asians in the city who were eligible to vote.

In the 1980s, there was racial violence against the Asian community by whites, and at the time the city did not employ any Asian police officers, leaving the Asian population to feel a lack of trust in the police. By 2003, the racial tensions had been greatly reduced, and the Quincy Police Department at that time had Asian officers.

By 2003, Quincy Asian Resources Inc. planned to establish a newsletter for Asian residents. In 2011, Boston Chinatown Neighborhood Center, Inc. (BCNC) executive director Elaine Ng stated that the center would begin to offer services in Quincy. The number of persons using BCNC services residing in Quincy increased by almost 300% in a period beginning in 2004 and ending in 2005.

Neighborhoods 

Quincy is divided into numerous neighborhoods with individual histories and characteristics.
 Adams Shore was originally developed as a summer resort location and is now a year-round residential area.
 Germantown was the site of a former planned manufacturing community begun in the 1750s to encourage German immigration and is now a residential neighborhood with a massive public housing project.
 Houghs Neck is a northeastern peninsular community named for Atherton Hough, who was granted the land in 1636 for use as a farm and orchard. Hough's Neck has a substantial Irish American population.
 Marina Bay is a residential-commercial area developed in the 1980s on the site of the closed Naval Air Station Squantum with high-rise condominiums, restaurants and a large marina.
 Merrymount is a primarily residential neighborhood and the site of Quincy's initial settlement.
 Montclair is the northwestern section of the city along West Squantum Street, bordering the town of Milton.
 North Quincy is a residential and commercial neighborhood along Hancock Street and Quincy Shore Drive that includes a substantial Asian American population with substantial Asian business growth as well as the location of one of the city's largest high schools, North Quincy High School.
 Quincy Center is the commercial and government center of the city where City Hall, Thomas Crane Public Library, the United First Parish Church (Old Stone Church), Quincy Masonic Building, and numerous office buildings and residential streets can be found.
 Quincy Point is a densely populated residential area east of Quincy Center, with commercial areas along Quincy Avenue and Southern Artery, that is also the site of the Fore River Shipyard.
 South Quincy is a residential area bordering the town of Braintree that includes Crown Colony office park and Faxon Park, a wooded  protected space.
 Squantum is the peninsular northernmost part of Quincy grew from being a summer resort adjacent to an early civilian, then Naval Air Station Squantum, into a year-round residential neighborhood. Squantum boasts one of the largest Irish American populations, per capita, in the United States.
 West Quincy is a residential and commercial section with immediate access to Interstate 93 and the site of several former granite quarries, now the Quincy Quarries Reservation, and the Granite Railway, first commercial railway in the United States.
 Wollaston, named for Captain Richard Wollaston, the leader of Quincy's original settlers, was an early rail-accessed commuter home for Boston workers that is now a densely populated residential and commercial area and site of Eastern Nazarene College.

Economy

During its history Quincy has been known as a manufacturing and heavy industry center, with granite quarrying dominating employment in the 19th century and shipbuilding at Fore River Shipyard and Squantum Victory Yard rising to prominence in the 20th century. The recent decades have seen a shift in focus to several large employers in the professional and service sector of the economy. Quincy is the location of the corporate headquarters of several firms, including Boston Financial Data Services, the Stop & Shop supermarket chain, Arbella Insurance Group and The Patriot Ledger, the publisher of the South Shore's largest regional newspaper.

Other major employers with offices in Quincy are State Street Corporation, Blue Cross Blue Shield of Massachusetts, Harvard Pilgrim Health Care and Boston Scientific. TACV, national flag carrier airline of Cape Verde, has its United States corporate office in Quincy. Icelandair has its North American headquarters in the city as well.

Income

Data is from the 2009–2013 American Community Survey 5-Year Estimates.

Government

Local
Quincy has a strong mayor government. The incumbent mayor, Thomas P. Koch, has served since 2008; he is the 33rd mayor of the city. Mayors in the city were elected to two-year terms. In 2013, the city's voters opted to extend the mayoral term to four years, beginning after the 2015 election.

In addition to the mayor, the city has a nine-member city council, with Noel T. DiBona serving as current president. Six councilors are elected to represent Quincy's wards, and three are elected at large. Councilors serve two-year terms. The city also has a school committee with seven members—the mayor and six members elected to staggered four-year terms.

Public health
In 2010, the city of Quincy was the first in the US to have its police department carry the nasal spray Narcan (Nalaxone) to combat the overdose outbreak associated with the opioid epidemic in the US. When the program first began, the city's officers were reviving an overdose victim every four to five days. By 2014, police officers had administered the opioid antagonist over 300 times. Other cities and police departments throughout the US developed their own Narcan-dispensing programs based on the model pioneered by the Quincy PD. In 2017, overdose deaths in the city and the Commonwealth of Massachusetts had declined, it was thought, due to the use of naloxone by the police and others. The state legislature, in 2018, required all pharmacies to keep Narcan in stock and available to anyone, without a prescription.

State
Quincy is represented in the Massachusetts State Senate by Democrat John F. Keenan (Norfolk and Plymouth district). Three members of the Massachusetts House of Representatives represent Quincy: Bruce Ayers (1st Norfolk district), Tackey Chan (2nd Norfolk district), and Ronald Mariano (3rd Norfolk district). Each representative is a Democrat, and Mariano is the speaker of the House.

Education

Quincy is home to various educational institutions, public and private, including one early childhood education center, one Montessori school, one Catholic school, one college-preparatory school, two colleges, Eastern Nazarene College, a private liberal arts and sciences college, and Quincy College, a public, localized college, two public high schools, five public middle schools, and 12 public elementary schools. In the 19th century, the city became an innovator in progressive public education with the Quincy Method, developed by Francis W. Parker while he served as Quincy's superintendent of schools. Four years after its implementation, a state survey found that Quincy students excelled at reading, writing, and spelling, and ranked fourth in their county in math.

Higher education
The city is home to Eastern Nazarene College, a college of the liberal arts and sciences located in Wollaston Park. The college relocated to the area in 1919 from its original location in Saratoga Springs, New York, where it was established as a holiness college in 1900. Quincy College, a community college in Quincy Center, operates under the auspices of the City of Quincy. The college is unusual in this respect, as it is the only one of Massachusetts' 16 community colleges to be run by a city rather than by the state. It is one of only two colleges in the United States organized this way.

Public primary and secondary education
Public education at the primary and secondary levels is managed by Quincy Public Schools, a system that includes one early childhood center, eleven elementary schools, five middle schools and two high schools.

Public high schools
 North Quincy High School
 Quincy High School

Public middle schools
 Atlantic
 Broad Meadows
 Central
 Point Webster
 South-West (formerly Reay E. Sterling)

Public elementary schools

 Amelio Della Chiesa Early Childhood Center
 Atherton Hough
 Beechwood Knoll
 Charles A. Bernazzani

 Clifford Marshall
 Lincoln-Hancock Community
 Merrymount
 Montclair

 Francis W. Parker
 Snug Harbor Community
 Squantum
 Wollaston

Private and alternative education
Private and alternative education institutions for children in preschool–8th grade include Quincy's three Catholic schools—Sacred Heart, St. Ann, and St. Mary. Because of declining enrollment and the ongoing economic crisis, the three merged to form the Quincy Catholic Academy, which opened in September 2010, at the site of the Sacred Heart school. The Woodward School for Girls is a non-sectarian college preparatory day school for girls in grades 6–12. Campus Kinder Haus (CKH) is operated by the Eastern Nazarene College on its Old Colony campus. The Adams Montessori School is open for children of preschool through elementary school age.

For a number of years, the Fore River Apprentice School was operated at the Fore River Shipyard to teach its students how to work in the shipyard.

Public libraries
The Thomas Crane Public Library serves as the public library system of Quincy, Massachusetts.

Supplementary education
Peter Jae established the Quincy Chinese Language School, which offers supplementary education for Chinese children, in 1988. As of 2003 it holds Cantonese-language classes for 150 students at the Sacred Heart School in North Quincy on Saturday mornings. The school at one time had 400 students but the school reduced itself in size when a lack of qualified teachers occurred.

The Chung Yee School is another Chinese school in Quincy. As of 2008 the headmaster is Harry Kwan, who originated from Hong Kong. That year the school had 100 students and charged $100 ($ adjusted for inflation) per child per month for Chinese language and culture after school classes. It was first established around 1996. The school was briefly closed by the Quincy Police Department in November 28, 2008 due to a lack of Massachusetts state and local government permits. After the state and municipal authorities cleared the school of allegations of child abuse, it was scheduled to reopen that year.
After the allegation, Chung Yee School continued to operate without obtaining a government childcare license for after-school programs.

In December 2002 the Vrindavana Preservation Society established the Vaisnava Academy which caters to Quincy's East Indian community and offers courses for children. Subjects include the Hindi language, Indian dance and music, and yoga.

Transportation

As part of Metro Boston, Quincy has easy access to transportation facilities. State highways and the Interstate system connect the Greater Boston area to the airport, port, and intermodal facilities of Boston. Due to its proximity to Boston proper, Quincy is connected not only by these modes of transportation but also to the regional subway system, operated by the Massachusetts Bay Transportation Authority (MBTA), known locally as "The T". The four subway or "T" stops in Quincy, which are on the MBTA's Red Line, are North Quincy Station, Wollaston Station, Quincy Center Station, and Quincy Adams Station.

Highways and roads
Interstate 93 and U.S. Route 1 travel south to north concurrently through Quincy beginning in the southwest, where the Quincy–Randolph border bisects the median between the northern and southern halves of the Exit 5 cloverleaf at Massachusetts Route 28. Following a route around the southern extent of the Blue Hills Reservation, this I-93 and US 1 alignment is along the former southern section of Route 128. The highway travels along a wooded wetland region of the Reservation, entering Quincy completely just beyond Exit 5 and then crossing into Braintree as it approaches the Braintree Split, the junction with Massachusetts Route 3. Weekday traffic volume averages 250,000 to 275,000 vehicles per day at this intersection, the gateway from Boston and its inner core to the South Shore and Cape Cod.

As Route 3 joins I-93 and US 1 at the Braintree Split, the three travel north together toward Boston around the eastern extent of the Blue Hills Reservation, entering West Quincy as the Southeast Expressway. The expressway provides access to West Quincy at Exit 8—Furnace Brook Parkway and Exit 9—Bryant Avenue/Adams Street before entering Milton. The Furnace Brook Parkway exit also provides access to Ricciuti Drive and the Quincy Quarries Reservation as well as the eastern entrance to the Blue Hills Reservation Parkways.

Principal numbered state highways traveling within Quincy include: Route 3A south to north from Weymouth via Washington Street, Southern Artery, Merrymount Parkway and Hancock Street to the Neponset River Bridge and the Dorchester section of Boston; Route 28, which travels south to north from Randolph to Milton along Randolph Avenue in Quincy through a remote section of the Blue Hills Reservation; and Route 53, which enters traveling south to north from Braintree as Quincy Avenue, turning right to form the beginning of Southern Artery in Quincy Point before ending at the intersection with Washington Street/Route 3A.

In addition to the Blue Hills parkways, Quincy includes two other Massachusetts Department of Conservation and Recreation parkways. Furnace Brook Parkway travels east from I-93 through the center of the city from West Quincy to Quincy Center and Merrymount at Quincy Bay. There the parkway meets Quincy Shore Drive at the mouth of Blacks Creek. Quincy Shore Drive travels in a northerly direction along the shore of Quincy Bay through Wollaston and into North Quincy, with much of its length abutting Wollaston Beach, then turns in a westerly direction upon intersecting with East Squantum Street and continues to meet Hancock Street at the Neponset River Bridge.

As for Quincy's other important city streets, Hancock Street begins at the southern extent of Quincy Center and travels north to Dorchester as a main commercial thoroughfare of Quincy Center, Wollaston and North Quincy. Washington Street enters the city at Fore River Rotary after crossing Weymouth Fore River and continues to Quincy Center, ending at Hancock Street. Along with Quincy Avenue and Southern Artery, other heavily traveled streets include Newport Avenue, which parallels Hancock Street to the west on the opposite side of the MBTA railway, Adams Street heading west from Quincy Center to Milton, and West and East Squantum Streets in the Montclair and North Quincy neighborhoods. Other streets are discussed in several of the neighborhood articles listed above.

Airport
Boston's Logan International Airport is accessible via MBTA Red Line connections at South Station, directly on the MBTA commuter boat (see below) or by motor vehicle using Interstate 93 or surface roads to the Ted Williams Tunnel.

MBTA rail and other commuter services
Subway service is available on the Red Line of the MBTA from four stations in Quincy: North Quincy, Wollaston, Quincy Center, and Quincy Adams. Commuter rail service operates out of Quincy Center. Both services serve South Station in Boston with connections to MBTA Commuter Rail and Amtrak intercity lines. Buses are also available for transportation in Quincy, including private bus lines and several lines provided by the MBTA. Most of the MBTA routes funnel through the Quincy Center station, which is the principal hub south of Boston for all MBTA bus lines. The southern bus garage for the MBTA system is adjacent to the Quincy Armory on Hancock Street.

Quincy was a major terminal for the commuter boat system that crosses Boston Harbor to Long Wharf, Hull, Rowe's Wharf, Hingham, and Logan Airport. The commuter boats, which were operated by Harbor Express under license by the Massachusetts Bay Transportation Authority, docked at the Fore River Shipyard in Quincy Point. Service ended in October 2013 after a water main break damaged the sea wall and wharf. Temporary repairs would have cost $15 million; permanent repairs $50 million. In 2014, the MBTA made the decision to permanently end the service and sell the land.

Sports 

Quincy has had brief flirtations with professional sports. The Quincy Chiefs of the minor league Eastern Basketball Association (the predecessor to the defunct Continental Basketball Association) played a single season in 1977–1978, and was coached and managed by former Boston Celtics executive Leo Papile. The Chiefs finished 12–19 in third place, and lost in the playoffs to eventual league champion Wilkes-Barre. Quincy's professional baseball team, the Shipbuilders, competed in the New England League in 1933, recording a 12–6 record before moving to Nashua midseason; a revival of the team played in the NEL from 1941 through to 1944. The final season of the Boston Minutemen of the North American Soccer League was played at Veterans Memorial Stadium, in 1976, finishing 7–17.

The Real Boston Rams of the soccer 4th division Premier Development League, an affiliate club of the New England Revolution, played in Veterans Memorial Stadium from 2014 to 2015.

In 2019, the Boston Cannons, a professional men's field lacrosse team in the Premier Lacrosse League (PLL) moved their home stadium from Boston to Veterans Memorial Stadium.

Quincy has had several football teams in the semi-pro Eastern Football League over the years. The current club, the Quincy Militia, played its inaugural season in the EFL in 2009. Founded in 2009 by long-time Quincy resident Vaughn Driscoll, new owners came into the team picture in 2013. Militia games are played July to October with home games at Veterans Memorial Stadium on Saturday nights. An earlier team, the Quincy Giants, played in the minor league Atlantic Coast Football League between 1969 and 1971.

Quincy's only college sports program is the "Lions" of Eastern Nazarene College, in the D-III Commonwealth Coast Conference of the National Collegiate Athletic Association (NCAA) and the Eastern College Athletic Conference (ECAC). Games are played at Bradley Field and the Lahue Physical Education Center on-campus, or at Adams Field and Veterans Memorial Stadium.

Quincy's high school sports programs are in the Patriot League: the D-III Fisher Division "Raiders" of North Quincy High School and the DIIA Keenan Division "Presidents" of Quincy High School, who are rivals. Quincy also hosted the youth baseball Babe Ruth League World Series in 2003, 2005 and 2008. High school baseball and Babe Ruth League games are played at Adams Field. High school football is played at Veterans Memorial Stadium

Notable people

 Abigail Adams, wife of John Adams, second President of the United States
 Abigail "Nabby" Adams Smith, daughter of Abigail and John
 Brooks Adams, noted historian
 Charles Francis Adams Sr., diplomat, son of John Quincy Adams
 Charles Francis Adams Jr., Civil War general, president of Union Pacific Railroad (1884–1890)
 Charles Francis Adams III, 44th Secretary of the Navy, mayor of Quincy
 Charles Adams (1770–1800), lawyer, son of John Adams
 John Adams Sr., father of president John Adams, grandfather of president John Quincy Adams
 John Adams, second President of the United States, first Vice President, founding father of U.S.
 John Quincy Adams, sixth President of the United States
 John Quincy Adams II, lawyer and politician
 Louisa Adams, wife of John Quincy Adams, sixth President of the United States
 Thomas Boylston Adams, Massachusetts Representative, justice
 Paul W. Airey, first Chief Master Sergeant of the Air Force
 Carl Andre, minimalist artist
 Louis Bell, Grammy Award-nominated record producer and songwriter
 Henry Beston, writer and naturalist
 Clara Blandick (1876–1962), actress, "Auntie Em" in The Wizard of Oz
 Eva Maria Brown (1856-1917), social reformer
 William R. Caddy, Medal of Honor recipient
 Karen Cashman, 1994 Winter Olympics speed skating bronze medalist
 Priscilla Chan, philanthropist and spouse of Mark Zuckerberg
 John Cheever, novelist
 Ken Coleman, sportscaster, called Boston Red Sox games from 1966–1974 and again from 1979–1989
 Dick Dale, surf guitarist
 Bill Dana, comedian (famous as "José Jiménez")
 William Delahunt, U.S. congressman for 10th District
 Peter Del Vecho, Oscar-winning producer of Frozen
 Dick Donovan, major league pitcher with the Boston Braves, Chicago White Sox and Cleveland Indians
 Joe Dudek, Denver Broncos player, college football Hall of Famer and 1985 Heisman Trophy candidate
 Joseph Dunford, 19th Chairman of the Joint Chiefs of Staff and 36th Commandant of the Marine Corps
 Billy De Wolfe, actor
 Illeana Douglas, actress
 Esther Grace Earl (1994–2010), Vlogger/ YouTuber/ Author/ Nerdfighter/ Activist in the Harry Potter Alliance
 Dick Flavin, poet laureate of Boston Red Sox
 Gwen Gillen, artist and sculptor
 Ruth Gordon, Oscar-winning actress and screenwriter
 John Hancock, patriot and president of Continental Congress
 Howard Deering Johnson, founder of Howard Johnson's chain
 John F. Keenan, State Senator from Norfolk and Plymouth district
 Pete Kendall, offensive lineman for NFL's Washington Redskins
 Helen Ketola, All-American Girls Professional Baseball League player
 Jake Kilrain, champion bare-knuckles boxer (1859–1937)
 Adolph "Jazz" Maffie, bookie, participant in Great Brink's Robbery
 James C. McConville, 40th Chief of Staff of the United States Army and 36th Vice Chief of Staff of the United States Army
 Sheri McCoy, CEO of Avon
 Ralph McLeod, Major League Baseball player (Boston Bees)
 Sam Mele, Major League Baseball player and manager; resided in Quincy while with Boston Red Sox
 Mike Mitchell, actor, comedian, co-host of Doughboys podcast
 Mike Mottau, player for NHL's Boston Bruins
 Donald Murray, Boston Globe columnist
 Francis Wayland Parker, educator
 Everett P. Pope, World War II Medal of Honor recipient
 Mary Pratt, All-American Girls Professional Baseball League player
 Dorothy Quincy Hancock Scott, socialite, wife of John Hancock
 Edmund Quincy (1628–1698), built Dorothy Quincy House (1685)
 Edmund Quincy (1681–1737), jurist
 Edmund Quincy (1703–1788), merchant
 John Quincy, colonel, General Court representative, and grandfather of Abigail Adams
 Josiah Quincy II, attorney, "the Patriot", newspaper propagandist
 Josiah Quincy III, president of Harvard University (1829–1845), U.S. Representative (1805–1813), Mayor of Boston (1823–1828)
 Josiah Quincy Jr., Mayor of Boston (1846–1848), built Josiah Quincy Mansion
 Josiah Quincy, General Court representative, assistant secretary of the Navy, mayor of Boston (1895–1899)
 Samuel Miller Quincy, lawyer, historian, Civil War soldier, 28th Mayor of New Orleans (May 5, 1865 – June 8, 1865)
 Lee Remick, Oscar-nominated actress
 William B. Rice, industrialist and local philanthropist
 Wilbert Robinson, Baseball Hall of Fame player and manager
 William Rosenberg, founder of Dunkin' Donuts
 Esther R. Sanger (1926–1995), social worker known as "Mother Teresa of South Shore"
 Richard A. Stratton, former United States Navy officer and prisoner of war
 Gordon R. Sullivan, retired United States Army general, who served as 32nd U.S. Army Chief of Staff
 Charles Sweeney, Air Force major general, pilot for Nagasaki nuclear attack
 Pete Varney, Major League Baseball catcher for (Chicago White Sox, Atlanta Braves)
 Lesley Visser, Boston Globe journalist and television sportscaster
 Solomon Willard, builder of the Bunker Hill Monument and creator of first commercial railway in America
 Walter Zink, professional baseball pitcher who played for the New York Giants

Gallery

See also 
 Quincy Mansion
 Quincy Mosque
 National Register of Historic Places listings in Quincy, Massachusetts
 USS Quincy, 3 ships

References

Further reading 
Browne, Patricia Harrigan, Quincy – A Past Carved in Stone, Images of America Series, Arcadia Publishing, July 1996, 
Pattee, William S., A History of Old Braintree and Quincy: With a Sketch of Randolph and Holbrook, Green & Prescott, 1879,  (at  Internet Archive)

External links

Official Webpage
Discover Quincy – Quincy tourism information

 
1625 establishments in Massachusetts
Cities in Massachusetts
Cities in Norfolk County, Massachusetts
Populated coastal places in Massachusetts
Populated places established in 1625